Salvador Garmendia Graterón (11 June 1928, Barquisimeto – 13 May 2001, Caracas) was a notable Venezuelan author, awarded in 1972 with the National Prize for Literature. In 1989 received the Juan Rulfo Prize for Tan desnuda como una piedra.

List of works

Novels
 Los pequeños seres (1958)
 Los habitantes (1961) 
 Día de ceniza (1963)
 La mala vida (1968)
 Los pies de barro (1972)
 Memorias de Altagracia (1974)
 El capitán Kid (1988)

Novellas
 El parque (1946)

Short story collections
 Cuentos cómicos (1991)
 Doble fondo (1966)
 Difuntos, extraños y volátiles (1970)
 Los escondites (1972) 
 El inquieto Anacobero y otros cuentos (1976)
 El brujo hípico y otros relatos (1979)
 Enmiendas y atropellos (1979)
 El único lugar posible (1981)
 Hace mal tiempo afuera (1986)
 La casa del tiempo (1986)
 La gata y la señora (1991)
 La media espada de Amadís (1998)
 No es el espejo (2002)
 El regreso (2004)
 El inquieto Anacobero y otros relatos (2004)
 Entre tías y putas (2008)

Non-fiction
 La novela en Venezuela (1966) 
 Crónicas Sádicas (1991)
 La vida buena (1995)
 Anotaciones en cuaderno negro (2003)
El gran miedo, Vida(s) y escritura(s) (2004)

Books for children 
Galileo en su reino (1994)
El cuento más viejo del mundo (1997)
Un pingüino en Maracaibo (1998)
El sapo y los cocuyos (1998)
El turpial que vivió dos veces (2000)
Mi familia de trapo (2002)
La viuda que se quedó tiesa (2004)

See also 
Venezuela
Venezuelan literature

References 
  Salvador Garmendia biography
  Perfiles: Salvador Garmendia - Lo afirmativo venezolano

External links 
  Salvador Garmendia, "A Country, A Decade", Encuentros No. 28, Sep 1998. Inter-American Development Bank Cultural Center

Venezuelan novelists
Venezuelan male writers
Male novelists
Venezuelan screenwriters
1928 births
2001 deaths
People from Barquisimeto
20th-century novelists
20th-century male writers
20th-century screenwriters